Addie is an unincorporated community in Jackson County, North Carolina, United States. Addie is located along U.S. Route 74, west of Willets-Ochre Hill and east of Sylva. The Jackson County School of Alternatives (the HUB) and Scotts Creek Elementary School are located here. T&S Hardwoods operates a lumber yard here, adjacent to the railroad that runs through the area.

The community was named for Nancy Adelaide Calhoun, the daughter of John Philemon Calhoun, who was the postmaster.

History

Addie was founded in the 1880s when a work camp for the construction of the Murphy Branch of the Western North Carolina Railroad set up in the vicinity, and was named. The location would later serve as a depot and crew change for the Southern Railway.

References

Further reading

External links
USGS: Addie
Travel Western North Carolina: Addie, WCU Digital Collections

Unincorporated communities in Jackson County, North Carolina
Unincorporated communities in North Carolina
Communities of the Great Smoky Mountains